Albert Paris Gütersloh (born Albert Conrad Kiehtreiber; 5 February 1887 – 16 May 1973) was an Austrian painter and writer.

Gütersloh worked as actor, director, and stage designer before he focused on painting in 1921.

As a teacher of Arik Brauer, Ernst Fuchs, Ruth Rogers-Altmann, Wolfgang Hutter, Fritz Janschka and Anton Lehmden he is considered one of the largest influences on the Vienna School of Fantastic Realism.

Decorations and awards
 1922 Theodor Fontane Prize for Arts and Letters
 1926 Reichel Prize (1926)
 1928 Grand Prix, Paris (1928) for his tapestries
 1935 National Award for Painting (1935)
 1937 Grand Prix, Paris (1937)
 1948 City of Vienna Prize for Painting and Graphics
 1952 Grand Austrian State Prize for Visual Arts
 1961 Grand Austrian State Prize for Literature
 1957 Ring of Honour of the City of Vienna
 1961 City of Vienna Prize for poetry
 1967 City of Vienna Prize for Literature
 1967 Austrian Decoration for Science and Art
 1987 Austrian commemorative postage stamp to mark his 100th birthday

See also 
Facing the Modern: The Portrait in Vienna 1900

References

1887 births
1973 deaths
20th-century Austrian painters
Austrian male painters
Fantastic realism
Artists from Vienna
Recipients of the Grand Austrian State Prize
Recipients of the Austrian Decoration for Science and Art
20th-century Austrian male artists